Denis Lambert (born September 18, 1961 in Montreal, Quebec) is a retired boxer from Canada, who competed for his native country at the 1984 Summer Olympics in Los Angeles, California. There he was defeated in the second round of the men's light welterweight (– 63.5 kg) division by Yugoslavia's eventual bronze medalist Mirko Puzović.

1984 Olympic results
Below is the record of Denis Lambert, a Canadian light welterweight boxer who competed at the 1984 Los Angeles Olympics:

 Round of 64: bye
 Round of 32: lost to Mirko Puzović (Yugoslavia) by decision, 0–5

References
 Profile

1961 births
Living people
Light-welterweight boxers
Boxers at the 1984 Summer Olympics
Olympic boxers of Canada
Boxers from Montreal
Canadian male boxers